Dequartavous "Tae" Crowder (born March 12, 1997) is an American football linebacker for the Pittsburgh Steelers of the National Football League (NFL). He played college football at Georgia.  He was drafted by the New York Giants with the final pick in the 2020 NFL Draft, making him that draft's Mr. Irrelevant.

College career
Crowder redshirted his freshman season at Georgia in 2015. He switched to inside linebacker from running back in 2016. Crowder performed an important special teams role in 2017, helping the Bulldogs reach the national championship game before falling to Alabama. Between 2018 and 2019 Crowder recorded 48 tackles including 4.5 for a loss. He was one of the 12 finalists for the Butkus Award. Crowder made a career-high 12 tackles in a loss to South Carolina. In his career, Crowder produced 115 tackles, 10 tackles for loss, five passes defensed, and 1.5 sacks.

Professional career

New York Giants

2020
Crowder was selected by the New York Giants with the 255th and final pick of the 2020 NFL Draft, thus becoming Mr. Irrelevant of the 2020 season. He was reunited with his former inside linebackers coach at Georgia Kevin Sherrer when he was drafted by the Giants. Crowder was placed on the active/non-football injury list by the Giants at the start of training camp on July 28, 2020. He was activated on August 9. Crowder was inactive for week 1 due to a hamstring injury. In Week 6 against the Washington Football Team, Crowder recovered a fumble forced by teammate Kyler Fackrell on Kyle Allen and returned it for a 43 yard touchdown during the 20–19 win. Crowder was placed on injured reserve with a hamstring injury on October 20, 2020. He was activated on November 28, 2020. In Week 13 against the Seattle Seahawks, Crowder recorded his first career sack on Russell Wilson during the 17–12 win.

2021
In Week 12, against the Philadelphia Eagles, Crowder recorded his first interception on Jalen Hurts during the 13–7 victory. Crowder ended the season with a career-high 130 tackles and led the team in tackles; he also recorded 2 interceptions and 1 forced fumble.

2022
After the release of Blake Martinez one week before the season started; Crowder was left as the best option at LB in the depth chart. In the season opener against the Tennessee Titans, Crowder recorded 7 tackles one of them being a big hit on running back Derrick Henry. In Week 10 against the Houston Texans the Giants decided to bench Crowder and move Jaylon Smith to inside linebacker and moved Micah McFadden to outside linebacker. On December 20, 2022, he was waived. He started the first eight games of the 2022 season and departed the main roster with 43 tackles, 1 sack, and one forced fumble. He was re-signed to the practice squad two days later.

Pittsburgh Steelers
On December 27, 2022, Crowder was signed by the Pittsburgh Steelers to their active roster.

Career statistics

References

External links
New York Giants bio
Georgia Bulldogs bio

1997 births
African-American players of American football
American football linebackers
Living people
People from Harris County, Georgia
Players of American football from Georgia (U.S. state)
Georgia Bulldogs football players
New York Giants players
Pittsburgh Steelers players
21st-century African-American sportspeople